Oscar Berglund (born April 13, 1984 in Örebro) is a Swedish footballer who plays for Östers IF as a goalkeeper.

Career 
In Helsingborg Berglund was a reserve goalkeeper of Helsingborg behind unthreatened Pär Hansson. He made his Allsvenskan debut for the club on 8 October 2007 in an away match against Hammarby. Berglund joined Assyriska FF on loan in January 2009. Berglund transferred to GIF Sundsvall on 3 January 2012.

References

External links 
 

1984 births
Living people
Sportspeople from Örebro
Association football goalkeepers
Helsingborgs IF players
GIF Sundsvall players
Swedish footballers